Simeneh, also rendered as Siminah or Simineh, may refer to:
 Simeneh-ye Olya
 Simeneh-ye Sofla